MV Menestheus was a Blue Funnel Liner launched in 1929. She was requisitioned by the Royal Navy for conversion to the auxiliary minelayer HMS Menestheus. She joined the 1st Minelaying Squadron based at Kyle of Lochalsh (port ZA) laying mines for the World War II Northern Barrage. 

When minelaying was completed in October 1943, she was retained for conversion to an amenities ship as part of a mobile naval base for British Pacific Fleet warships. She underwent further conversion at Vancouver in 1944 including installation of a movie theater and canteen staffed by mercantile crews of the Royal Fleet Auxiliary service. The ship had been painted grey for service in the North Atlantic, but was repainted white for service in the western Pacific. Conversion included a brewery to make beer for shipboard consumption. A technical documentary illustrating the installation of the brewing plant is held by the Imperial War Museum and featured Head Brewer Lieutenant Commander George Brown RNVR. English Mild Ale was sold at 9d per pint on 'the world's only floating brewery' in the ship's Davy Jones bar.  When hostilities with Japan ended, she was returned to Blue Funnel Line in 1946.

Notes

References
 
 

Minelayers of the Royal Navy
1929 ships
World War II minelayers of the United Kingdom